Love Songs is a compilation album by American band Earth, Wind & Fire. It was released on January 13, 2004 by Columbia/Legacy.

Track listing

References

2004 albums
2004 compilation albums
Earth, Wind & Fire compilation albums
Albums produced by Maurice White
Albums produced by Charles Stepney
Columbia Records compilation albums